Samuel Larkin Warner (June 14, 1828 – February 6, 1893) was a U.S. Representative from Connecticut, brother of Levi Warner.

Born in Wethersfield, Connecticut, Warner attended Wilbraham Academy, Wilbraham, Massachusetts, and the law department of Yale College. He graduated from the law department of Harvard University in 1854. He was admitted to the bar in Boston, Massachusetts, in 1854. He commenced the practice of law in Portland, Connecticut, in 1855. He served as member of the State house of representatives in 1858. He moved to Middletown in 1860.
He served there as mayor 1862-1866. He served as delegate to the Republican National Convention in 1864, 1888, and 1892.

Warner was elected as a Republican to the Thirty-ninth Congress (March 4, 1865 – March 3, 1867). He was not a candidate for renomination. He resumed the practice of law. He died in Middletown, Connecticut on February 6, 1893. He was interred in Indian Hill Cemetery.

Footnotes

References

1828 births
1893 deaths
Burials at Indian Hill Cemetery
Mayors of Middletown, Connecticut
Republican Party members of the Connecticut House of Representatives
Harvard Law School alumni
Republican Party members of the United States House of Representatives from Connecticut
19th-century American politicians
Yale College alumni